The 2006 Women's European Water Polo Championship Qualifier was split into two tournaments to determine the last four competing teams for the 2006 Women's European Water Polo Championship, held from September 2 to September 9, 2006 in Belgrade, Serbia. Already qualified for the event are hosts Serbia, Hungary, Italy and Russia.

Group A (France, Germany, Great Britain and the Netherlands) played a round robin in Nancy, France, while Group B (Czech Republic, Greece, Spain and Ukraine) competed in Madrid, Spain. Both events were held from April 7 to April 9, 2006.

Teams

GROUP A — Nancy, France
 
 
 

GROUP B — Madrid, Spain

Group A

Friday April 7, 2006 

Saturday April 8, 2006 

Sunday April 9, 2006

Group B

Friday April 7, 2006 

Saturday April 8, 2006 

Sunday April 9, 2006

See also
 2006 Men's European Water Polo Championship Qualifier

References
 LEN Magazine (issue 1, May 2006)

Women's European Water Polo Championship
Women
2006
2006
Euro